It's Got Me Again! is a 1932 Warner Bros. Merrie Melodies animated short film directed by Rudolf Ising. The short was released on May 14, 1932.

It is one of the first films released under the Merrie Melodies brand and the first nominated for the Academy Award for Best Animated Short Film in 1932. The title refers to the song "It's Got Me Again!" (music by Bernice Petkere, lyrics by Irving Caesar) which plays during the cartoon.

Plot
The cartoon depicts a tribe of cartoon Mickey Mouse-like mice who move and dance through a musical instrument workshop, while the song It's Got Me Again! plays on a dusty gramophone. When a hungry cat shows up and tries to eat the mice, most of them escape—but one mouse is trapped. However, he is not eaten, because the other mice attack the cat and save their companion.

Home media
It's Got Me Again! is available as a bonus feature on disc 2 of the Looney Tunes Golden Collection: Volume 3.

References

External links
 

1932 films
1932 animated films
1932 comedy films
American black-and-white films
Films scored by Frank Marsales
Films directed by Rudolf Ising
Animated films about mice
Merrie Melodies short films
Warner Bros. Cartoons animated short films
Animated films about cats
1930s Warner Bros. animated short films
1930s English-language films